Hieracium schultzii, the roughstem hawkweed, is a species of plant in the tribe Cichorieae within the family Asteraceae. It is widespread across much of Mexico with a few populations in Guatemala and western Texas.

Leaves are both on the stem and at the bottom. One stalk can produce 3-25 flower heads in a conical or flat-topped array. Each head has 25-40 yellow ray flowers but no disc flowers.

References

friesii
Flora of Mexico
Flora of Guatemala
Flora of Texas
Plants described in 1861